Georg Wrba (3 January 1872 – 9 January 1939) was a German sculptor and graphic artist. He created some 3,000–4,000 works, including as a collaborator of the Zwinger workshop.

Life 
Wrba was born in Munich in 1872, the son of a smith. His younger brother Max Wrba became an architect in Dresden.

Wrba began his training with Jakob Bradl the Elder and his son Jakob Bradl the Younger. From 1891 to 1896, he studied at the Akademie der Bildenden Künste München under Syrius Eberle.

After some time spent in Italy (with Egon Rheinberger), a trip made possible by a travel award from Prince Regent Luitpold, he settled in Munich as an independent sculptor in 1897 and became director of the city's school of sculpture.

In 1906 and 1907, he worked in Berlin, where he created sculptures for buildings for the architects Ludwig Hoffmann and Alfred Messel.

Wrba then moved to Dresden, where from 1907 to 1930 he taught at the Dresden Academy of Fine Arts. He brought the Dresden school of sculpture into contact with the reforming ideas of the Deutscher Werkbund and was a founding member of the Dresden Artists' Association, known as "Die Zunft" ("The Guild"). The basic aim of the "Werkbund", and also of "Die Zunft", was to achieve a collaboration between and integration of various forms of art, rejecting ornamentation for its own sake: painting and sculpture were to form integral parts of architecture.

In Dresden he made, among many other works, the Marie Gey Fountain near the Dresden Hauptbahnhof in the Südvorstadt, which was donated by a Dr. Heinze for his wife, a student at the Kunstakademie, who had died young. In 1910 Wrba agreed a contract for the restoration and completion of the missing parts of the Zwinger, for which he directed the work of 53 sculptors from 1911 to 1933, and himself created many groups of figures modelled from the life.

Wrba died on 9 January 1939 in Dresden, where a street is named after him. He is buried in the Munich Waldfriedhof.

Selected works 
Georg Wrba's works principally comprise sculptures for buildings and fountains, and small-scale figures.
 1899: Seal Fountain (Seehund-Brunnen) (bronze), Berlin, in the inner courtyard of the Rudolf Virchow Clinic
 1899: sculptural decoration on the fountain of the Bismarck Tower (Bismarckturm) on the Starnberger See
 c. 1900: figures and carvings in St. Maximilian's Church, Munich
 1900: Diana auf der Hirschkuh ("Diana on a Doe"), Kunsthalle Bremen
 1900: Europa auf dem Stier ("Europa on the Bull"), Kunsthalle Bremen
 1902: Warriors' Fountain (Kriegerbrunnen) in Nördlingen
 1902: façade decoration on the extension building of the Kunsthalle Bremen
 1905: St. Mang Fountain in Kempten 
 1905: marble bust of Luitpold, Prince Regent of Bavaria
 1906: equestrian statue of Otto I von Wittelsbach, Wittelsbach Bridge, München
 1906: Chicken Fountain (Hennebrunnen) in Aschersleben
 1906–1908: putti for the Villa Wollner in Dresden
 1906–1911: contributions to the decorative building sculptures on the Altes Stadthaus in Berlin, including "Allegories of the Civic Virtues" and the decor of the banqueting hall (Bärensaal – "Bears' Hall")
 1907: allegorical bronze group on top of the Charlottenburg Gate by the Charlottenburg Bridge, Berlin (melted down)
 1907: two marble portals with allegories in the entrance hall of the Kaufhaus des Westens in Berlin
 1907: portraits of Georg Treu, Hans Erlwein, Otto Gussmann, Cornelius Gurlitt, Fritz Schumacher, Martin Dülfer
 1908: altar figure of "The Good Shepherd" in the Church of the Reconciliation, Dresden
 1909: Bismarck Fountain on the market place in Arnstadt
 1910: group of "Bacchus on a Drunken Donkey" and two sitting bronze lions with shields on the east side, and the Hietzig Fountain on the west side, of the Neues Rathaus in Dresden
 1910: figure of Aphrodite on the Marie Gey Fountain in the Friedrich-List-Platz in Dresden
 1910: relief of "Siegfried's Entrance into Worms" on the Cornelianum in Worms
 1910: bronze lions in front of the Neues Rathaus in Dresden
 1911: Rathaus Fountain at the Neues Rathaus in Dresden
 1912/1913: contributions to the Märchenbrunnen in the Volkspark Friedrichshain in Friedrichshain, Berlin
 1911–1933: artistic director of the restoration works on the Zwinger, Dresden
 1917: "Large Bathing Figures" (Große Badende) on a mussel shell (bronze) for a country house in Klein Flottbek owned by Max Emden; since 1928 on the Roman-style bathing pool of the palazzo of Max Emden on the Brissago Islands on Lake Maggiore, Switzerland
 1911: bronze bust of Peter von Klemperer
 1912: sculptural decorations on the Erker, the doorways and the fountain in the courtyard of the Rappolthaus in Hamburg
 1918: Diana on a Doe, Stadtpark Hamburg
 1918: Large Bathing Figures (Große Badende), Aschersleben
 1918: portrait bust of Max Klinger
 1921: statuette "Longing of Love" (Liebessehnsucht), Gera Art Gallery 
 1922: bronze bust of Carl Zeiß
 1922: Europa Fountain on the Königsheimplatz in Dresden
 1922: statuette "Naked Dancer" (Nackte Tänzerin), Bleichert Collection, Leipzig
 1922: bronze bust of Gerhart Hauptmann
 1922: "Small Sitting Figure arranging her Hair" (Kleine Sitzende, Haar ordnend)
 1923: bronze bust of Alfred Tiedemann
 1924: "The Kiss" (Der Kuss), in private ownership
 1925–1930: monument to the fallen of World War I in the old graveyard in Wurzen, with Oswin Hempel and Arthur Lange (1875–1929)
 1926: Mönckeberg Fountain in Hamburg (WV 273); construction of the fountain (to designs made in collaboration with the architect Fritz Schumacher) 1914–1920; completion of the side bronze figures 1926 (badly damaged in 1944; the lion was reconstructed by the Hamburg sculptor Philipp Harth in 1965)
 1927: "Contemplating Figure" (Die Sinnende), in private ownership
 1927: group of figures "Widow with two Children" (Witwe mit zwei Kindern) for the war memorial in Radebeul
 1928: "Runner" (Läufer), in private ownership
 1929: "Death the Cutter" (Der Schnitter Tod) for the crematorium in Forst
 1929: market fountain in Rochlitz
 1930/1934: gravestones for Bruno Steglich and the Wiede family in the graveyard of Trebsen
 1932: large group of architectural sculpture inside the cathedral (Dom) in Wurzen

Further reading 
 Drago Bock: Es sucht seinesgleichen. In: Leipziger Volkszeitung, Ausgabe Wurzen, 10 May 2010
 Günter Kloss: Georg Wrba (1872–1939). Ein Bildhauer zwischen Historismus und Moderne (= Studien zur internationalen Architektur- und Kunstgeschichte, Band 2.) Michael Imhof Verlag, Petersberg 1998 
 Thomas Pöpper (ed.): Georg Wrba (1872–1939). Im Schatten der Moderne Plöttner Verlag, Leipzig 2009 
 Rolf Günther: Der Symbolismus in Sachsen 1870–1920.= Dresden, Sandstein, 2005

External links 

 
 article on Georg Wrba in Stadtwiki Dresden 
 www.cultuurarchief.nl: Ruud van Capelleveen – Georg Wrba (2006) 
 www.bildhauerei-in-berlin.de: Information on five works by Wrba in Berlin 
 Gunther Trentzsch: Brunnen in Dresden – eine Auswahl 
 Historical photographs of Max Emden's villa on the Brissago Islands, Lake Maggiore; sculpture of "Bathing Woman" (Die Badende) at the Bagno Romano

Notes and references 

Academic staff of the Dresden Academy of Fine Arts
Artists from Munich
1872 births
1939 deaths
19th-century German sculptors
German male sculptors
20th-century German sculptors
20th-century German male artists